Steven Zachary McGuire Putnam (born July 3, 1987) is an American former professional baseball pitcher. He has played in Major League Baseball (MLB) for the Cleveland Indians, Colorado Rockies, Chicago Cubs and Chicago White Sox.

Amateur career
Born in Rochester, Michigan, Putnam attended Pioneer High School in Ann Arbor, Michigan. At Pioneer, Putnam was the Michigan Gatorade Player of the Year and Mr. Baseball in 2005, and also led the team to a state title in 2004. Putnam then attended the University of Michigan, where he played for the Michigan Wolverines baseball team as a pitcher and outfielder, and was a two-time All-American. In 2007, he played collegiate summer baseball with the Chatham A's of the Cape Cod Baseball League. As a hitter, Putnam hit .307 with 19 home runs and had an overall ERA of 3.36 over three seasons for the Wolverines.

Professional career
Putnam was drafted by the Cleveland Indians in the fifth round of the 2008 Major League Baseball Draft. He spent the next four seasons in the Indians' minor league system: 2008 with the Mahoning Valley Scrappers, 2009 with the Kinston Indians and Akron Aeros, 2010 with the Aeros and Columbus Clippers, and 2011 with the Clippers. In 2011, Putnam had a 6–3 record and a 3.65 ERA in 44 games.

Cleveland Indians
Putnam was a September call-up, and made his major league debut on September 13, 2011. In 2011 for the Indians, Putnam went 1–1 with a 6.41 ERA in eight games.

Colorado Rockies
Putnam was traded to the Colorado Rockies on January 20, 2012, in exchange for Kevin Slowey. Putnam spent most of 2012 with Triple-A Colorado Springs, but did pitch in two games with the Rockies.

Chicago Cubs
The Chicago Cubs claimed Putnam off waivers from the Rockies on November 2, 2012. He was outrighted off the roster on October 9, 2013, after appearing in five games for the team; he instead spent most of the season with the Triple-A Iowa Cubs.

Chicago White Sox
Putnam signed a minor league deal with the Chicago White Sox in November 2013. On April 17, 2014, Putnam's contract was purchased, and he was placed on Chicago's 25-man roster; he spent most of the season with the White Sox. Putnam ended establishing career bests in all pitching categories, finishing with a 1.98 ERA in  innings, while also going 6-for-7 in save opportunities. The following season, Putnam doubled his ERA from 2014, finishing with a 4.07 ERA in 49 games. In  innings, he struck out 64 batters. The next two seasons, he wound up spending most of the time on the disabled list, appearing in only 32 games over the 2016 and 2017 season.

Putnam underwent Tommy John surgery in June 2017, and elected free agency in December 2017. He missed the 2018 season while recovering from his surgery.

Boston Red Sox
On December 18, 2018, Putnam signed a minor league deal with the Boston Red Sox. He suffered a hamstring injury in early March 2019, and spent the season on the roster of the Triple-A Pawtucket Red Sox on the injured list.

Second Stint with White Sox
On March 3, 2020, Putnam signed a minor league deal with the Chicago White Sox. Putnam was released by the White Sox organization on June 26, 2020.

References

External links

MiLB.com player profile

1987 births
Living people
Cleveland Indians players
Colorado Rockies players
Chicago Cubs players
Chicago White Sox players
Michigan Wolverines baseball players
Chatham Anglers players
Mahoning Valley Scrappers players
Kinston Indians players
Akron Aeros players
Peoria Saguaros players
Columbus Clippers players
Colorado Springs Sky Sox players
Iowa Cubs players
Charlotte Knights players
Major League Baseball pitchers
People from Rochester, Michigan
Baseball players from Ann Arbor, Michigan